"Out of the Dark" is a song by Austrian singer Falco from his eighth studio album Out of the Dark (Into the Light). The song was also released as a single. Both the album and the single were released posthumously in 1998.

The song was written by Falco and Torsten Börger. It was produced by Börger.

The song reached No. 2 in Germany and Austria and No. 3 in Switzerland.

Track listings 
CD maxi single EMI Electrola 8 85456 2 (EMI) (1998, Netherlands)
 "Out of the Dark" (3:36)
 "Der Kommissar (2000)" (3:47)
 		 	 
Promo CD single EMI Electrola P 519.947 (1998)
CD single EMI Electrola 8853992
 "Out of the Dark" (3:34)
 "Out of the Dark" (Instrumental) (3:34)

Charts

Year-end charts

Cover versions 
 In 2002, Sunterra presented their version on their album Lost Time.
 In 2003, Terminal Choice covered the song on his album Menschenbrecher.
 In 2004, Stahlhammer released the song on their album Stahlmania.
 In 2010,  recorded a Czech version under the name “Stíny a mráz” (lit. “Shadows and freeze”) and released it on their 2011 album Drsnej kraj.
 In 2013, Ost+Front released the song on their single "Bitte schlag mich".
 In 2014, Axel One released a metal cover of the song featuring Paul Bartzsch from We Butter the Bread with Butter.
 In 2020, Eisbrecher released the song on their album Schicksalsmelodien.

References

External links 
 Falco – "Out of the Dark" at Discogs

1998 songs
1998 singles
Falco (musician) songs
German-language songs
English-language German songs
Macaronic songs
Electrola singles
EMI Records singles
Songs written by Falco (musician)